is a Japanese manga series written and illustrated by Aya Hirakawa. It has been serialized in Shogakukan's shōnen manga magazine Weekly Shōnen Sunday since December 2021.

Publication
Shogakukan has collected its chapters into individual tankōbon volumes. The first volume was released on March 17, 2022. As of December 16, 2022, four volumes have been released.

Volume list

Reception
The series was nominated for the Next Manga Award in the print category in 2022, and ranked 15th. The series also ranked second in the Nationwide Publishers' Recommended Comics of 2023.

See also
Kunisaki Izumo no Jijō, another manga series by the same author
Tenshi to Akuto!!, another manga series by the same author

References

External links
 

Romantic comedy anime and manga
Shogakukan manga
Shōnen manga